Tamara Nahamievna Musakhanov (born January 31, 1924 — February 27, 2014) was a Soviet sculptor, and ceramist of Mountain Jewish origin. Member of Union of Artists in the former Soviet Union and in Israel. She was also an Honored Artist of Dagestan.

Biography
Tamara Musakhanov managed to finish several art schools in different cities. She began her education at the pedagogical school in Makhachkala where she met her husband, Abram Vladimirovich Fridberg. She then continued her education at the Moscow Kalinin School of industrial art, which she graduated in 1949. She worked in the media of sculpture, painting, and crafts in ceramics and faience before continuing her art education in Alma-Ata.

Scenes of her works represented simple values in life – national traditions in work and leisure, clothing and holidays.

Musakhanov was awarded the Medal of the Ministry of Culture and the Union of Artists of the Russian Federation. She had certificates and diplomas for participation in the Republican art exhibitions and achievements in the development of Soviet arts and crafts. Many of her works are in the collections of 15 Russian art museums, including the Tretyakov Gallery, the State Museum of Oriental Art, the museum-estate Kuskovo, as well as in private collections in Russia, Israel, Germany, England and America.

Since 1990, Musakhanov lived in Israel in Haifa, where she actively participated in the following exhibitions: a group exhibition of repatriates "Omanut ole" (1994), a group show in the gallery "Tsafon" (1998), a solo exhibit in Haifa (1998), an exhibition of artists from the Caucasus in Netanya (1999), artists of the Caucasus in Merkaz ha-music Tel Aviv-Yafo (2000), etc.

In an interview with Israeli journalist Hana Rafail, Musakhanov said:

Musakhanov's husband, Abram Fridberg, was an "Honored Artist of Russia". He  died in Israel.

Tamara Musakhanov and Abram Fridberg had two children, Michael Fridberg and Love Mataeva.

Musakhanov's brother, Albert Nahamievych Musakhanov, held a doctorate degree in agricultural science and lived in the suburbs of Moscow. Sister Asya Nahamievna Musakhanov, graduated from the University in the Faculty of Philology, she worked at the Makhachkala Pedagogical Institute.

Tamara Musakhanov died in 2014. She is buried in the city of Haifa, Israel.

Awards

 Honored Cultural Worker of the RSFSR.
 Honoured Art Worker of Dagestanian Autonomous Soviet Socialist Republic.
 Honoured Artist of Dagestan.

References

External links
 Artworks of Tamara Musakhanov

1928 births
People from Derbent
People from Dagestan Oblast
Russian Jews
Mountain Jews
Jewish sculptors
20th-century sculptors
20th-century ceramists
Soviet sculptors
Soviet emigrants to Israel
2014 deaths
Jewish women sculptors
Stroganov Moscow State Academy of Arts and Industry alumni